Ilse Voigt (1905–1990) was a German stage, film and television actress.

Selected filmography
 Intrigue and Love (1959)
 The Rabbit Is Me''' (1965)
 Seine Hoheit – Genosse Prinz (1969)
 Husaren in Berlin (1971)

 References 

 Bibliography 
 Peter Cowie & Derek Elley. World Filmography: 1967''. Fairleigh Dickinson University Press, 1977.

External links 
 

1905 births
1990 deaths
People from Pirna
German film actresses
German stage actresses